Jeri Porter  (born January 23, 1970) is a former women's basketball program head coach at George Mason University. She coached for six years at Radford University, where she posted a 93-85 record, including a 43-39 mark in conference play. In 2007, she led Radford to a 23-win record; a second time in school history and two Big South Championship in a row.

She also coached at the University of North Alabama. From 1992 to 1998, she coached at Liberty University. She played at Liberty, and is a member of the Liberty Flames Hall of Fame.

References

External links
 Jeri Porter profile

1970 births
Living people
Place of birth missing (living people)
American women's basketball coaches
Francis Marion Patriots women's basketball coaches
George Mason Patriots women's basketball coaches
Liberty Lady Flames basketball coaches
Liberty Lady Flames basketball players
North Alabama Lions women's basketball coaches
Radford Highlanders women's basketball coaches